VFD may refer to:

 Factory Workers' Union of Germany,, a former trade union in Germany
 Vacuum fluorescent display, a display device on consumer electronics equipment
 Variable-frequency drive, a speed control method for electric motors
 Veterinary Feed Directive, in U.S. agricultural policy
 Virtual Floppy Disk (file type), used by Microsoft Virtual PC
 VFD (A Series Of Unfortunate Events), a fictional secret organization in the A Series of Unfortunate Events and All the Wrong Questions novel series
 Volunteer fire department, a local emergency service

See also
 Vicarius Filii Dei
 V. F. D. Pareto